Jiangyong County is a county of Hunan Province, China, it is under the administration of Yongzhou prefecture-level City.

Located on the south margin of the province, it is bordered on the west by Guangxi. The county is bordered to the northeast by Dao County, to the southeast by Jianghua County, to the south by Fuchuan County of Guangxi, to the west by Gongcheng County of Guangxi, to the south by Guanyang County of Guangxi. The county has 6 towns and four ethnic townships under its jurisdiction, the county seat is Xiaopu Town.

Nüshu script is a local script understood only by women in Jiangyong County.

Township-level divisions
Jiangyong County administratively governs 6 towns and four ethnic townships:

6 towns
 Cushijiang
 Huilongyu
 Shangjiangyu
 Taochuan
 Xiacengpu
 Xiaopu
4 Yao ethnic townships
 Yao Lanxi
 Yao Qianjiadong
 Yao Songbai
 Yao Yuankou

Climate

References

External links 

Jiangyong
County-level divisions of Hunan
Yongzhou